KAGO (1150 AM) is a radio station broadcasting a News Talk Information format. Licensed to Klamath Falls, Oregon, United States.  The station is currently owned by Basin Mediactive LLC,  and features programming from Fox News Radio, Compass Media Networks, Premiere Networks, and Westwood One.

KAGO signed on in 1923 on 1220 kHz as KFJI. In 1927 it moved to 1200 kHz. As a result of the 1928 reallocations it moved to 1370 kHz. It moved to 1210 kHz in 1932 then to 1240 kHz in 1941 as a result of the NARBA agreement. It moved to 1150 kHz in 1950.

References

External links

FCC History Cards for KAGO

AGO (AM)
News and talk radio stations in the United States
Klamath Falls, Oregon
Radio stations established in 1947
1947 establishments in Oregon